Grava may refer to:


Persons
 Dario Grava (born 1948), French retired professional football defender
 Gianluca Grava, retired Italian association football defender
 Jean-Marc Grava (born 1971), French track and field athlete 
 Lino Grava (1927-2010), Italian professional football player
 Roger Grava (1922–1949), Italian born French football striker
 Sig Grava (1934–2009), American scholar and architect

 Robert da Grava (born 1944), retired Luxembourgian football midfielder

Other uses
 Grava 4, a 2002 album by American duo Drexciya
 Grava school complex, Athens, Greece
 Cima Grava, also known as Grabspitze or Hochferner, the second highest peak in the Pfunderer Mountains 
 Microsoft Codename "Grava", a set of tools for creating and using educational and training materials

See also
 Gravina (disambiguation)